John Calvert is a radio commercials producer, managing director of Airforce: The Radio Commercial and Advertising Music Production Company, a voiceover artist, radio advertising consultant, speaker, and awards judge.

Career history 
1984-1986: Radio Mercury, Crawley, UK. Commercial Producer.
1986-1996: Essex FM, Essex, UK. Commercial Producer / Creative Director.
1997–Present: Airforce (Radio Commercials & Music Production). Creative Director, Managing Director, Owner.

Career path 
A strong fascination with tape recorders led John Calvert to be inspired by the British Broadcaster Kenny Everett. 

After an initial stint with 'Radio Dorking', a hospital radio station at Dorking Hospital in Dorking, Surrey UK. John left his job in an electrical store to become a Technical Operator at the new Radio Mercury in Crawley, West Sussex, UK.

Within a year, John became Radio Mercury's Commercial Producer.

In 1986, John was employed by Essex Radio PLC as a Commercial Producer. 1997 saw the founding of 'The Creative Team', a highly successful venture involving producing high-quality Radio Commercials for local radio advertisers.

In 1996, John Calvert joined Airforce, a prominent Radio Commercial and Advertising Music production company.

In June 2006, John Calvert acquired Airforce and became joint owner with Sonia Williams.

Since June 2006, John Calvert has provided voiceovers for production companies and international brands. These include the BBC, Canon, BP, IBM, Hasbro, Microsoft, Metro Newspapers, Hewlett Packard, Epson, Exxon and many more.

John Calvert is also the 'voice of radio advertising' in the UK's leading radio industry publication 'The Radio Magazine'. he is also in-demand as a judge for radio advertising awards including the Arqiva Awards(organised by the RAB/Radiocentre) and the Vox Awards. John also is a keynote speaker at business seminars and has lectured at the UK's leading university for Media Studies - Bournemouth University.

Awards 
Awards for John Calvert's craft has been recognised by The Independent Radio Advertising Awards, The Creative Circle Honours, The Kudos Awards & The Sony Awards.

In May 2011, 4 productions created by John Calvert were nominated as finalists in the 2011 Vox Awards. 'Best Retail Commercial', 'Best Services Commercial', 'Best Male Voiceover Performance' & 'Best Female Voiceover Performance'. John's commercials received more nominations and awards (2 winning commercials) than any other 2011 entrant.

In 2012, 3 productions created by John Calvert were nominated in the Vox Awards. He was the winner in the 'Best Service Sector' category.

In 2013, 4 productions created by John Calvert were nominated in the Vox Awards. (More nominations than any other entrant) He was the winner in the 'Best Retail Radio Commercial' category.

In 2016 Nominated in the 2016 Vox Awards.

In 2017 Nominated in 'Best Use of Music' category in the 2017 Vox Awards.

In 2021, John was awarded 'Vox Judges Choice' and The Sayer Producer of the Year in the Vox Awards.

References 

Living people
Year of birth missing (living people)
British radio personalities
People from Calne